Shatsi Namatovu Musherure Kutesa commonly known as Shatsi Kuteesa is a Ugandan lawyer, politician and legislator. She is the Member of parliament Mawogola County North Sambabule district in the parliament of Uganda.

Background and Education 
Shatsi is the daughter of former foreign affairs minister Sam Kuteesa and twin sister to Charlotte Kainerugaba the wife to president Museveni's son Muhoozi Kainerugaba.

She succeeded her father as MP Mawogola county after a contested election.

Earlier in the National Resistance Movement (NRM) party primaries leading to the 2021 elections, Shatsi had been defeated by president Museveni's younger brother, Godfrey Aine Kaguta also known as "Sodo". Sodo's win was challenged by Shartsi prompting the NRM electoral commission to direct both candidates to run as independents.

One day to the 2021 Uganda general elections, Sodo was advised by his family and Yoweri Museveni to withdraw from the race in favor of Shatsi. Shatsi eventually won in the general elections.

Shatsi has two degrees in Law.

Career 
Shatsi is the current member of parliament (MP) representing Mawogola north county in the parliament of Uganda. In parliament,  she serves on the committee of legal and parliamentary affairs.

References 

Ugandan women lawyers
Women members of the Parliament of Uganda
21st-century Ugandan women politicians
21st-century Ugandan politicians
Living people
Year of birth missing (living people)